The Montagu–Chelmsford Reforms or more briefly known as the Mont–Ford Reforms, were introduced by the colonial government to introduce self-governing institutions gradually in British India. The reforms take their name from Edwin Montagu, the Secretary of State for India from 1917 to 1922, and Lord Chelmsford, the Viceroy of India between 1916 and 1921. The reforms were outlined in the Montagu-Chelmsford Report, prepared in 1918, and formed the basis of the Government of India Act 1919. These are related to constitutional reforms. Indian nationalists considered that the reforms did not go far enough, while British conservatives were critical of them. The important features of this act were that:

1. The Imperial Legislative Council was now to consist of two houses: the Central Legislative Assembly and the Council of State.

2. The provinces were to follow the Dual Government System or dyarchy.

Background
Edwin Montagu became Secretary of State for India in June 1917 after Austen Chamberlain resigned following the capture of Kut by the Turks in 1916 and the capture of an Indian army staged there. He put before the British Cabinet a proposed statement regarding his intention to work towards the gradual development of free institutions in India with a view to ultimate self-government. Lord Curzon thought that this gave Montagu too much emphasis on working towards self-government and suggested that he work towards increasing association of Indians in every branch of the administration and the gradual development of self-governing institutions with a view to the progressive realization of responsible government in India as an integral part of the British Empire. The Cabinet approved the statement with Curzon's amendment incorporated in place of Montagu's original statement.

Reforms

In late 1917, Montagu went to India to meet Lord Chelmsford, the Viceroy of India, and leaders of Indian community, to discuss the introduction of limited self-government to India, and the protection rights of minority communities. He drew up a report, with Bhupendra Nath Bose, Lord Donoghmore, William Duke and Charles Roberts.

The Report went before Cabinet on 24 May and 7 June 1918 and was embodied in the Government of India Act of 1919. These reforms represented the maximum concessions the British were prepared to make at that time. The franchise was extended, and increased authority was given to central and provincial legislative councils, but the viceroy remained responsible only to London.

The changes at the provincial level were very significant, as the provincial legislative councils contained a considerable majority of elected members. In a system called "dyarchy," the nation-building departments of government were placed under ministers who were individually responsible to the legislature. The departments that made up the "steel frame" of British rule were retained by executive councilors who were nominated by the Governor. They were often, but not always, British and who were responsible to the governor. The Act of 1919 introduced Diarchy in the provinces. Accordingly, the Rights of the Central and Provincial Governments were divided in clear-cut terms. The central list included rights over defence, foreign affairs, telegraphs, railways, postal, foreign trade etc. The provincial list dealt with the affairs like health, sanitation, education, public work, irrigation, jail, police, justice etc. The powers which were not included in the state list vested in the hands of the centre. In case of any conflict between the 'reserved' and 'unreserved' powers of the State (the former included finance, police, revenue, publication of books, etc. and the latter included health, sanitation, local-self government etc.), the Governor had its final say. In 1921, the "Diarchy" was installed in Bengal, Madras, Bombay, the United Provinces, the Central Provinces, the Punjab, Bihar and Orissa, and Assam; in 1932 it was extended to the North-West Frontier Province.

In 1921 another change recommended by the report was carried out when elected local councils were set up in rural areas, and during the 1920s urban municipal corporations were made more democratic and "Indianized".

The main provisions were the following:

 The secretary of state would control affairs relating to Government of India.
 The Imperial Legislative Council would comprise two chambers- the Council of State and the Central Legislative Assembly.
 The Imperial Legislative Council was empowered to enact laws on any matter for whole of India. 
 The Governor General was given powers to summon, prorogue, dissolve the Chambers, and to promulgate Ordinances.
 The number of Indians in Viceroy's Executive Council would be three out of eight members. 
 Establishment of bicameral Provincial Legislative councils.
 Dyarchy in the Provinces-
 Reserved subjects like Finance, Law and Order, Army, Police etc.
 Transferred subjects like Public Health, Education, Agriculture, Local Self-government etc.
 There would henceforth be direct election and an extension of Communal franchise.
 A council of princes was also set up with 108 members to allow princes to debate matters of importance. But it had no power and some princes didn't even bother to attend what was little more than a 'talking shop'

Reception in India
Many Indians had fought with the British in the First World War and they expected much greater concessions. The Indian National Congress and the Muslim League had recently come together demanding self-rule.
The 1919 reforms did not satisfy political demands in India. The British repressed opposition, and restrictions on the press and on movement were re-enacted through the Rowlatt Acts introduced in 1919. These measures were rammed through the Legislative Council with the unanimous opposition of the Indian members. Several members of the council including Jinnah resigned in protest. These measures were widely seen throughout India as a betrayal of the strong support given by the population for the British war effort.

Gandhi launched a nationwide protest against the Rowlatt Acts with the strongest level of protest in the Punjab. The situation worsened in Amritsar in April 1919, when General Dyer ordered his troops to open fire on demonstrators hemmed into a tight square, resulting in the deaths of at least 379 civilians. Montagu ordered an inquiry into the events at Amritsar by Lord Hunter. The Hunter Inquiry recommended that General Dyer, who commanded the troops, be dismissed, leading to Dyer's sacking. Many British citizens supported Dyer, whom they considered had received unfair treatment from the Hunter Inquiry. The conservative Morning Post newspaper collected a subscription of £26,000 for General Dyer and Sir Edward Carson moved a censure motion on Montagu which was nearly successful. Montagu was saved largely due to a strong speech in his defence by Winston Churchill.

The Amritsar massacre further inflamed Indian nationalist sentiment ending the initial response of reluctant co-operation. At the grass roots level, many young Indians wanted faster progress towards Indian independence and were disappointed by lack of advancement as Britons returned to their former positions in the administration. At the Indian National Congress annual session in September 1920, delegates supported Gandhi's proposal of swaraj or self-rule – preferably within the British Empire or out of it if necessary. The proposal was to be implemented through a policy of non-cooperation with British rule meaning that Congress did not field candidates in the first elections held under the Montagu-Chelmsford reforms in 1921.

Review
The Montagu-Chelmsford report stated that there should be a review after 10 years. Sir John Simon headed the committee (Simon Commission) responsible for the review, which recommended further constitutional change. Three round table conferences were held in London in 1930, 1931 and 1932 with representation of the major interests. Mahatma Gandhi attended the 1931 round table after negotiations with the British Government. The major disagreement between the Indian National Congress and the British was separate electorates for each community which Congress opposed but which were retained in Ramsay MacDonald's Communal Award. A new Government of India Act 1935 was passed continuing the move towards self-government first made in the Montagu-Chelmsford Report.

References

Further reading
 Montagu Millennium entry on Montagu-Chelmsford Report
One Scholar’s Bibliography
Britannica Encyclopaedia: Montagu-Chelmsford Report
Puja Mondal, Montagu-Chelmsford Reforms and the Government of India Act, 1919.
Self study history: Montagu-Chelmsford Reforms
Paul Johnson (1991). A History of the Modern World: from 1917 to the 1990s. Weidenfeld and Nicolson London.
 Merriam-Webster's Biographical Dictionary entry on Edwin Montagu (1995). Merriam-Webster

British Empire
1919 in British India
Indian independence movement
1919 in India
Government of British India